The Spanish War may refer to:

 Any one of the Anglo-Spanish Wars
 Any one of the Franco-Spanish Wars
 War of the Spanish Succession, a war fought among several European powers against the Kingdoms of France, Spain, and the Electorate of Bavaria.
 Spanish–American War, an armed military conflict between Spain and the United States that took place between April and August 1898, over the issues of the liberation of Cuba.
 Spanish Civil War, a major conflict that devastated Spain from 17 July 1936 to 1 April 1939.